California's 57th State Assembly district is one of 80 California State Assembly districts. It is currently represented by Democrat Lisa Calderon.

District profile 
The district encompasses an eastern portion of the Gateway Cities region as well as part of the southern San Gabriel Valley. The district is primarily suburban and heavily Latino.

Los Angeles County – 4.7%
 Avocado Heights
 East La Mirada
 Hacienda Heights
 Industry – 93.6%
 La Habra Heights
 La Mirada
 La Puente
 Norwalk – 62.2%
 Santa Fe Springs
 South El Monte – 72.6%
 South San Jose Hills
 South Whittier
 West Whittier-Los Nietos
 Whittier

Election results from statewide races

List of Assembly Members 
Due to redistricting, the 57th district has been moved around different parts of the state. The current iteration resulted from the 2011 redistricting by the California Citizens Redistricting Commission.

Election Results 1992 - present

2020

2018

2016

2014

2012

2010

2008

2006

2004

2002

2000

1998

1996

1994

1992

See also 
 California State Assembly
 California State Assembly districts
 Districts in California

References

External links 
 District map from the California Citizens Redistricting Commission

57
Government of Los Angeles County, California
Avocado Heights, California
Hacienda Heights, California
City of Industry, California
La Mirada, California
La Puente, California
Puente Hills
Santa Fe Springs, California
Whittier, California